Jamarra Ugle-Hagan (born 4 April 2002) is a professional Australian rules footballer with the Western Bulldogs in the Australian Football League (AFL). He was a member of the Western Bulldogs' Next Generation Academy, which helps scout and develop Aboriginal and Multi-Cultural players, and people who would not otherwise play the sport of Australian rules football. He attended secondary school at Scotch College, Melbourne.

AFL career
Jamarra Ugle-Hagan was taken at Pick 1 in the 2020 national draft, when the Western Bulldogs matched the Adelaide Crows' bid. He is the first Bulldogs No.1 Draft Pick since Adam Cooney in 2003, and only the second Indigenous player to be taken with the first selection since Des Headland in 1998. Ugle-Hagan is known for his athleticism and speed off the mark as a key forward. 

Ugle-Hagan played his first AFL game for the Western Bulldogs on 11 July 2021 in their Round 17 loss to the Sydney Swans. On debut, Ugle-Hagan collected 7 disposals and 1 mark. Despite staying goalless, Ugle-Hagan was kept in the team for round 18, where he kicked 3 goals in a strong performance against the Gold Coast Suns. On 5 August 2021, it was revealed that Ugle-Hagan signed on with the Bulldogs until the end of 2024.

Ugle-Hagan received a Rising Star nomination for his five-goal performance against Melbourne during round 19, 2022.

Statistics 
''Statistics are correct to the end of round 6 2022. 
|- style="background-color: #EAEAEA"
! scope="row" style="text-align:center" | 2021
|
| 22 || 5 || 7 || 2 || 25 || 10 || 35 || 14 || 8 || 1.4 || 0.4 || 5.0 || 2.0 || 7.0 || 2.8 || 1.6
|-
! scope="row" style="text-align:center" | 2022
|
| 2 || 6 || 4 || 4 || 23 || 6 || 29 || 11 || 7 || 0.7 || 0.7 || 3.8 || 1.0 || 4.8 || 1.8 || 1.2
|- class="sortbottom"
! colspan=3| Career
! 11
! 11
! 6
! 48
! 16
! 64
! 25
! 15
! 1.0
! 0.5
! 4.4
! 1.5
! 5.8
! 2.3
! 1.4
|}

Honours and achievements
Individual
 AFL Rising Star nominee: 2022

References

External links 

2002 births
Living people
Oakleigh Chargers players
Western Bulldogs players
Australian rules footballers from Victoria (Australia)
Indigenous Australian players of Australian rules football
People educated at Scotch College, Melbourne